The St. Louis Catholic Church is a historic church in La Grange, California. It was added to the National Register of Historic Places in 1979.

The church, built in 1854, is the oldest in Stanislaus County.  Its California historic resources review states "Architecturally it is significant as a vernacular Greek Revival structure, and remains as evidence of a style which dotted the towns and hillsides of Gold Rush California."

References

Roman Catholic churches in California
Roman Catholic Diocese of Stockton
Churches on the National Register of Historic Places in California
Greek Revival church buildings in California
Roman Catholic churches completed in 1854
Buildings and structures in Stanislaus County, California
National Register of Historic Places in Stanislaus County, California
1854 establishments in California
19th-century Roman Catholic church buildings in the United States